A/B may refer to:
A/B (album), an album by Kaleo
A/B testing, a type of randomized experiment
A/B Sound System, a type of public address system

See also
AB (disambiguation)